George McNeil or McNeill may refer to:
George McNeil (artist) (1908–1995), American abstract expressionist painter
George McNeil (ice hockey) (1914–1997), Canadian ice hockey player and coach
George McNeill (born 1975), American golfer
George McNeill (sprinter) (born 1947), Scottish athlete and footballer
George E. McNeill (1836–1906), American labor leader and writer
George Monroe McNeill (1845–1931), Union army soldier and a founder of Carterville, Illinois